EMPT may refer to:

 Electromagnetic Pulse Technology
 Emergency Medical Technician: Paramedic